Chippewa Park is located on the shore of Lake Superior, south of Thunder Bay, Ontario. From May Long Weekend to Labour Day Weekend (Canadian dates) the park operates a children's amusement park which features a C.W. Parker Carousel that was built between 1918 and 1920. There was also a Wildlife Park which was home to a number of animals native to North Western Ontario.  The zoo was closed to the public in 2017. There is a public beach and views of the 'Sleeping Giant'.  Chippewa Park also has cabin accommodation, RV sites and tenting sites. The park also has sandy beaches, views, and a public zoo which features birds and animals native to the area.

Friends of Chippewa Park 

The Friends of Chippewa Park (TFOCP) is a Not-For-Profit organization, founded in 2002, whose aim is to "restore Chippewa Park to its full potential".  TFOCP raised and invested over $6 million to preserve the Park's "rich history, renovate and improve the physical grounds & structures, and enhance its natural beauty for all to enjoy".  With a membership of neighbours, friends, and citizens, TFOCP work to re-establish Chippewa Park as a destination of choice.  Their mission statement is " To provide public amenities and to preserve, protect and promote the public park known as Chippewa Park located in and owned by the City of Thunder Bay with the intention that the park reaches its full potential as a public recreation area to the full benefit of the community."

External links
 The Friends of Chippewa Park
 Thunder Bay.ca - Chippewa Park
 Campsource.ca - Chippewa Park

References

Parks in Thunder Bay